Hangga't May Hininga is a 1996 Philippine action film directed by Toto Natividad. The film stars Phillip Salvador and Anjanette Abayari.

Cast
 Phillip Salvador as Ellis
 Anjanette Abayari as Leah
 Jackie Lou Blanco as Beth
 Tirso Cruz III as Cong. Ramirez
 Dennis Roldan as Acosta
 Paquito Diaz as Gen. Dominguez
 Karl Angelo Legaspi as Alex
 Dindo Arroyo as Edwin
 Allan Paule as Tony Boy
 Roy Alvarez as Billy Boy
 Dave Brodett as Carpio
 Manjo del Mundo as Roque
 Rene Hawkins as Warden
 Polly Cadsawan as Polly
 Freddie Ondra as Bagyo
 Jose Balagtas as Labor Leader

References

External links

1996 films
1996 action films
Filipino-language films
Philippine action films
Star Cinema films
Films directed by Toto Natividad